Cielos del Sur S.A., operating as Austral Líneas Aéreas, more commonly known by its shortened name Austral, was a domestic airline of Argentina, the sister company of Aerolíneas Argentinas. It was the second-largest domestic scheduled airline in the country, after Aerolíneas Argentinas. As a subsidiary of Aerolíneas Argentinas, the company shares its headquarters with that airline, which is located in the Aeroparque Jorge Newbery of Buenos Aires, the main base of operations of the company.

Austral was currently fully integrated into Aerolíneas Argentinas; however, some differences arise, especially those relying upon the unions the staff of both companies are affiliated to, which lead to constant conflicts. In May 2020 it was announced that Austral would merge with Aerolíneas, saving an estimated 100 million US Dollars and eliminating Austral as a brand. Austral ended operations on 30 November 2020.

, the airline operated an all-Embraer 190 fleet.

History 
CATASACI focused its services on southwestern Argentina, but it also operated international flights to Montevideo, Puerto Montt and Punta Arenas. Aerotransportes Litoral Argentino (ALA) was a Rosario–based company that was founded in 1957 to operate flights between this city and Buenos Aires using Aero Commander equipment and operated flights within northern Argentina. In 1965, Pan Am acquired a 22% stake in ALA in return for supplying the company with DC-3s. A year later, CATASACI acquired a 30% holding in ALA and the services of both companies were integrated.

At , the ALA fleet consisted of two C-46s, five DC-3s, two DC-6Bs and five YS-11A-300s that served a domestic network including Buenos Aires, Corrientes, Formosa, Goya, Paraná, Paso de los Libres, Posadas, Resistencia, Rosario, Salta, Santa Fe and Tucumán, plus regional services to Antofagasta and Asunción, whereas CATASACI had a fleet that included seven BAC One-Elevens —four 400s and three 500s—, one C-46, one DC-6 and three YS-11s. Austral Líneas Aéreas was formally established in  that year from the merger of CATASACI and ALA. In practice, operations of the latter airline were absorbed by CATASACI, which was rebranded as Austral Líneas Aéreas S.A. after merging. Austral inherited both companies' fleet, consisting of turboprops NAMC YS-11 and jetliners BAC One-Eleven.

Austral became a government-owned company in 1980. After poor economic performances, there were two failed attempts to re-privatise Austral in 1981 and 1983. All that time Austral and Aerolíneas Argentinas were competitors on a number of domestic routes. Realizing that such a situation could not persist much longer, the government decided again to privatise Austral. This was much resisted by the Aerolíneas Argentinas' personnel, and more specifically its pilots, who claimed their salaries were lower than those of Austral's counterparts. Aerolíneas Argentinas' pilots union understood the government effort was not to solve their affiliates salary conflict, but to focus on privatising a loss-making carrier as Austral was instead. The consequence of this discrepance was the announcement that Aerolíneas Argentinas flights were to be indefinitely suspended by way of a strike, effective 1 July 1986. The strike affected both Aerolineas Argentinas' domestic and international operations. Argentine as well as foreign carriers were benefited from this strike. Ironically, Austral was included among those carriers, gaining the domestic market share Aerolíneas Argentinas lost.

Austral became once again a privately owned firm when it was acquired by the holding company Cielos del Sur S.A. in late 1987. The acquisition generated some controversy on the Argentine aviation sector at that time, as it was raised that the new owner had little or no experience in managing an airline. In April 1988, the carrier became an IATA member. Shortly afterwards, the company faced a major accident during its new private era on 12 June 1988, when a McDonnell Douglas MD-81 hit a tree on a low visibility approach into Posadas and crashed. Apart from the 22 fatalities involved in the accident, it also spread concerns on the aviation sector over the airline's poor rate of occupation on some routes, of just 10.32% for this particular flight.

Cielos del Sur S.A. and Iberia formed a consortium to acquire an 85% stake in Aerolíneas Argentinas in 1990, within the framework of that flag carrier privatisation. Soon afterwards, Cielos del Sur S.A. sold Austral to Iberia. The destiny of both Aerolíneas Argentinas and Austral became aligned thereafter. By July 1998, the company was 10% owned by its erstwhile competitor Aerolíneas Argentinas.

On 21 July 2008 the Argentine Government took the airline back into state control after acquiring 99.4% of the share capital for an undisclosed price. The remaining 0.6% continues to be owned by the company's employees. In September 2008, Argentina's Senate approved the nationalization of Aerolíneas Argentinas and its subsidiary Austral Líneas Aéreas on a 46–21 vote in favor of the takeover.

In  Aerolíneas Argentinas launched a new paint scheme to revamp the airline's image. The new livery resembles the colour blue of Argentina's flag and the colour yellow of the sun. As its subsidiary airline, Austral also adopted the new image. Austral's livery actually differs from the Aerolíneas Argentinas' one by a red cheatline only. In the meantime the airline also announced the incorporation of 20 new Embraer 190 to its fleet, receiving the first two of them in September 2010.

Destinations 

The Federal Corridor, was a two-way route linking the cities of Bariloche, Buenos Aires, Córdoba, Iguazú, Mendoza and Salta. Although the corridor is commercially run by Aerolíneas Argentinas, the route is operated using Austral equipment.

Fleet 

Austral Líneas Aéreas underwent a major fleet renewal. In 2009, the company signed a contract with Embraer for the purchase of 20 Embraer 190s, in a deal worth  million that was 85% financed by BNDES.

The airline's fleet consisted of the following aircraft:

Retired

Austral previously operated the following equipment:

BAC One-Eleven 400
BAC One-Eleven 500
Boeing 737-200
CASA CN-235 (operated for Inter Austral, a former Córdoba-based subsidiary of Austral)
Curtiss C-46
Douglas DC-4
Douglas DC-6
Douglas DC-6A
Douglas DC-6B
Fokker F27-100
McDonnell Douglas DC-9-30
McDonnell Douglas DC-9-50
McDonnell Douglas MD-81
McDonnell Douglas MD-82
McDonnell Douglas MD-83
McDonnell Douglas MD-88
NAMC YS-11-100
NAMC YS-11A-300

Accidents and incidents 
, Aviation Safety Network records 11 accidents/incidents for Austral Líneas Aéreas, totalling 224 deaths. The list below includes hull-loss accidents only.

See also 
Aerolíneas Argentinas accidents and incidents
List of BAC One-Eleven operators
List of Embraer 190 operators
List of NAMC YS-11 operators
Transport in Argentina

Notes

References

External links 

 Official website (archived, 29 Mar 2018)
Unión de Aviadores de Líneas Aéreas (UALA) 

Defunct airlines of Argentina
Former SkyTeam affiliate members
Airlines established in 1957
2020 disestablishments in Argentina
Airlines disestablished in 2020

1957 establishments in Argentina
Argentine brands